Lionbridge Technologies, Inc is an American company that provides translation and localization services. Based in Waltham, Massachusetts, the company has operations in 26 countries.

History
Lionbridge was founded in 1996. In 2005, they acquired Bowne Global Solutions, then the largest localization provider. In 2014 they acquired Darwin Zone, a digital marketing services agency based in Costa Rica, and Clay Tablet Technologies, a content connectivity software firm.

In 2015, they acquired Zurich-based CLS Communication, a translation services provider, and Geotext, a legal translation company. In December 2016, it was announced that Lionbridge entered into a definitive agreement to be acquired by H.I.G. Capital. The deal was announced closed in May, 2017 and, subsequently, the company was delisted from Nasdaq. Lionbridge is now a privately-held company and part of the portfolio of H.I.G. companies.

In July 2017, John Fennelly was named chief executive officer. The founder of the company, Rory Cowan, is chairman of the board of directors.

In December 2018, Lionbridge fully acquired Tokyo-based Gengo, a crowdsourced translation and artificial intelligence training data provider.

In November 2020, Lionbridge agreed with Telus International to sell its artificial intelligence division.

Operations
Lionbridge provides translation and localization in many languages, with offices in 26 countries.

Controversies/court cases
A securities class action lawsuit involving the company was filed in July 2001 under "Samet v. Lionbridge Technologies, Inc. et al." in the United States District Court for the Southern District of New York.

In 2006, a Lionbridge employee was awarded noneconomic damages of USD $366,250 and economic damages of USD $221,433 due to failure by the company to fulfill its obligation to help the employee obtain a green card.

A 2008 court case involved an unfair dismissal claim by a former Lionbridge employee fired for union recruitment activities at the company's Warsaw office to protect employment conditions. Protests in support were held in Denmark, Spain, Poland, and Ireland.

Recognition
2015 - Lionbridge made GMI Ratings' list of 100 Most Trustworthy Companies in America.

2018 - Ranked on Forbes' list of America's Best Large Employers for receiving high scores in an anonymous employee survey evaluating organizations on workplace standards.

2018 - Ranked #283 on Forbes' list of Best Employers for Women 2018.

2019 - Ranked #282 on Forbes' list of America's Best Employers 2019.

2020 - Ranked #388 on Forbes' list of America's Best Employers For Diversity 2020.

2021 - Ranked #123 on Forbes' list of America's Best Employers For Diversity 2021.

2021 - Named #1 on FlexJobs' list of Top 100 Companies to Watch for Remote Jobs in 2021.

References

External links 

Companies formerly listed on the Nasdaq
Translation companies
Software companies of the United States
Software companies based in Mumbai
Companies established in 1996